Aleixo Pereira (9 April 1924 – 14 April 1962) was a Brazilian footballer. He played in three matches for the Brazil national football team in 1946. He was also part of Brazil's squad for the 1946 South American Championship.

References

External links
 

1924 births
1962 deaths
Brazilian footballers
Brazil international footballers
Place of birth missing
Association football midfielders
Sport Club Corinthians Paulista players
Olaria Atlético Clube players